Albert Cohen, nicknamed "Alta", (December 25, 1908, in Brooklyn, New York – March 11, 2003, in Maplewood, New Jersey), was a professional baseball player. He attended South Side High School in New York. He was Jewish.

In the minor leagues, he was an All Star with the Triple A Toledo Mud Hens.

In 1931 he batted .316–5–47 for the Hartford Senators, and led the league in walks (87). Cohen made hid major league debut in the second game of the 1931 season, taking over for pinch hitter Ike Boone.

The next day, Cohen was farmed out to Hartford.  Cohen was leading the Eastern League in hitting in 1932 with a .409 average in 59 games when the league folded in mid-season. He became a pitcher and had two good years with Toledo (American Association) in 1936–37 with a 29–19 record. He played outfield in the majors from 1931 to 1933 with the Brooklyn Robins/Dodgers and Cincinnati Reds.

Cohen's father gave him the name Alta (Yiddish for "old") as the traditional Jewish trick to fool the angel of death during the 1918 flu epidemic. In the majors, Alta's teammates called him "Schoolboy."

Cohen founded the Altco Products Co. in 1940, with offices throughout the state, and served as president for 44 years before retiring in 1984.  He was a member of the board of directors of the Newark Beth Israel Medical Center and the Daughters of Israel Geriatric Center in West Orange, and a member of the Green Brook Country Club in North Caldwell.  Also a philanthropist, he was honored in the 1980s by Hebrew University, in New York City.

He lived in Verona and South Orange before moving to Maplewood, New Jersey, where he died in his home.

References

External links

1908 births
2003 deaths
Brooklyn Robins players
Brooklyn Dodgers players
Chattanooga Lookouts players
Cincinnati Reds players
Crisfield Crabbers players
Durham Bulls players
Hartford Senators players
Jersey City Giants players
Jersey City Skeeters players
Jewish American baseball players
Jewish Major League Baseball players
Macon Peaches players
Major League Baseball outfielders
Minneapolis Millers (baseball) players
People from Maplewood, New Jersey
Rocky Mount Buccaneers players
Sportspeople from Brooklyn
Baseball players from New York City
Toledo Mud Hens players
Williamsport Grays players
20th-century American Jews
21st-century American Jews